Never-Ending is the third studio album by German power metal group Mystic Prophecy, released in October 2004.  This is the last album of a trilogy and also the last to feature Gus G and Dennis Ekdahl.

Track listing
 "Burning Bridges" (Liapakis / Albrecht) - 4:13
 "Time Will Tell" (Liapakis / Gus G.) - 3:54
 "Under A Darkened Sun" (Liapakis / Albrecht) - 4:08
 "Dust Of Evil" (Liapakis / Gus G. / Albrecht) - 4:29
 "In Hell" (Liapakis / Gus G.) - 3:33
 "Never Surrender" (Liapakis / Gus G.) - 4:31
 "Wings Of Eternity" (Liapakis / Albrecht) - 4:34
 "When I'm Falling" (Liapakis / Gus G.) - 3:46
 "Warriors Of Lies" (Liapakis / Albrecht) - 6:12
 "Dead Moon Rising" (Liapakis / Gus G.) - 5:15
 "Never Ending" (Liapakis / Gus G. / Albrecht) - 2:41

Credits
 Roberto Dimitri Liapakis - vocals
 Gus G - Guitars 
 Martin Albrecht - Bass
 Dennis Ekdahl - drums

2004 albums
Mystic Prophecy albums
Nuclear Blast albums